In mathematics, symbolic dynamics is the practice of modeling a topological or smooth dynamical system by a discrete space consisting of infinite sequences of abstract symbols, each of which corresponds to a state of the system, with the dynamics (evolution) given by the shift operator. Formally, a Markov partition is used to provide a finite cover for the smooth system; each set of the cover is associated with a single symbol, and the sequences of symbols result as a trajectory of the system moves from one covering set to another.

History 
The idea goes back to Jacques Hadamard's 1898 paper on the geodesics on surfaces of negative curvature. It was applied by Marston Morse in 1921 to the construction of a nonperiodic recurrent geodesic. Related work was done by Emil Artin in 1924 (for the system now called Artin billiard), Pekka Myrberg, Paul Koebe, Jakob Nielsen, G. A. Hedlund.

The first formal treatment was developed by Morse and Hedlund in their 1938 paper. George Birkhoff, Norman Levinson and the pair Mary Cartwright and J. E. Littlewood have applied similar methods to qualitative analysis of nonautonomous second order differential equations.

Claude Shannon used symbolic sequences and shifts of finite type in his 1948 paper A mathematical theory of communication that gave birth to information theory.

During the late 1960s the method of symbolic dynamics was developed to hyperbolic toral automorphisms by Roy Adler and Benjamin Weiss, and to Anosov diffeomorphisms by Yakov Sinai who used the symbolic model to construct Gibbs measures. In the early 1970s the theory was extended to Anosov flows by Marina Ratner, and to Axiom A diffeomorphisms and flows by Rufus Bowen.

A spectacular application of the methods of symbolic dynamics is Sharkovskii's theorem about periodic orbits of a continuous map of an interval into itself (1964).

Examples
Concepts such as heteroclinic orbits and homoclinic orbits have a particularly simple representation in symbolic dynamics.

Itinerary
Itinerary of point with respect to the partition is a sequence of symbols. It describes dynamic of the point.

Applications 
Symbolic dynamics originated as a method to study general dynamical systems; now its techniques and ideas have found significant applications in data storage and transmission, linear algebra, the motions of the planets and many other areas. The distinct feature in symbolic dynamics is that time is measured in discrete intervals. So at each time interval the system is in a particular state. Each state is associated with a symbol and the evolution of the system is described by an infinite sequence of symbols—represented effectively as strings. If the system states are not inherently discrete, then the state vector must be discretized, so as to get a coarse-grained description of the system.

See also
 Measure-preserving dynamical system
 Combinatorics and dynamical systems
 Shift space
 Shift of finite type
 Complex dynamics
 Arithmetic dynamics

References

Further reading

 Bruce Kitchens, Symbolic dynamics. One-sided, two-sided and countable state Markov shifts.  Universitext, Springer-Verlag, Berlin, 1998. x+252 pp.  
 
 G. A. Hedlund, Endomorphisms and automorphisms of the shift dynamical system. Math. Systems Theory, Vol. 3, No. 4 (1969) 320–3751

External links
 ChaosBook.org Chapter "Transition graphs"

 
Dynamical systems
Combinatorics on words